Edward Clive Rouse  (15 October 1901 – 28 July 1997) was an English archaeologist and writer on archaeology, who specialized in medieval wall paintings. He served as President of the Royal Archaeological Institute from 1969 to 1972. He was known as Clive Rouse, and was usually credited as E. Clive Rouse.

Background and early life
Rouse was born on 15 October 1901 in Stroud, Gloucestershire, the son of Edward Foxwell Rouse, a furniture-maker in Acton, West London, and his wife Frances Sarah Sams, whose family had been dairymen to Buckingham Palace. He was educated at St. Ronan's School, Worthing, then Gresham's School, Holt, and the St Martin's School of Art.

Career
After training as an artist, Rouse developed a passion for medieval wall paintings and worked with E. W. Tristram, Professor of Design at the Royal College of Art, on their recording and conservation. With assistants, he spent years removing or reducing wax coatings which had been misguidedly added to paintings, and conserving them using authentic materials, particularly slaked lime.

He was also a lecturer and worked to educate clergy and church architects in the care of wall paintings.

He collected Chinese armorial porcelain, and built up the largest private collection in England. He gave away many pieces, some to the Ashmolean Museum, Oxford.

War service
Rouse served from 1939 to 1945 with the Intelligence unit of the Royal Air Force Volunteer Reserve. He was awarded the MBE for services to the Medmenham Central Interpretation Unit.

Private life and death
Rouse never married. He died on 28 July 1997 in Gerrards Cross, Buckinghamshire.

Publications
Guide to Buckinghamshire (1935)
The Old Towns of England (1936)
Collins Guide to English Parish Churches (1958)
Discovering Wall Paintings (1968)
Mediaeval Wall Paintings (1991, reprinted 1996)

Honours and other positions
Fellow of the Society of Antiquaries, 1937
Member of the Order of the British Empire, 1946
FRSA, 1968
Liveryman of the Worshipful Company of Fishmongers, 1962
Vice-President, Royal Archaeological Institute, 1965–1969
President, Buckinghamshire Archaeological Society, 1969–1979
President, Royal Archaeological Institute, 1969–1972
Honorary DLitt, University of Sussex, 1983

References
Who's Who 1993 (A. & C. Black, London, 1993)
Obituary by Jane Rutherfoord in The Independent, 6 August 1997
Edward Clive Rouse, M.B.E., M.A., D.Litt. – obituary at web site of Society of Antiquaries of London

1901 births
1997 deaths
English archaeologists
Fellows of the Society of Antiquaries of London
People educated at Gresham's School
Members of the Order of the British Empire
Royal Air Force Volunteer Reserve personnel of World War II
Presidents of the Royal Archaeological Institute